The 1933 VFL season was the 37th season of the Victorian Football League (VFL), the highest level senior Australian rules football competition in Victoria. The season featured twelve clubs, ran from 29 April until 30 September, and comprised an 18-game home-and-away season followed by a finals series featuring the top four clubs.

The premiership was won by the South Melbourne Football Club for the third time, after it defeated  by 42 points in the 1933 VFL Grand Final.

Premiership season
In 1933, the VFL competition consisted of twelve teams of 18 on-the-field players each, plus one substitute player, known as the 19th man. A player could be substituted for any reason; however, once substituted, a player could not return to the field of play under any circumstances.

Teams played each other in a home-and-away season of 18 rounds; matches 12 to 18 were the "home-and-way reverse" of matches 1 to 7.

Once the 18 round home-and-away season had finished, the 1933 VFL Premiers were determined by the specific format and conventions of the Page–McIntyre system.

Round 1

|- bgcolor="#CCCCFF"
| Home team
| Home team score
| Away team
| Away team score
| Venue
| Crowd
| Date
|- bgcolor="#FFFFFF"
| 
| 9.10 (64)
| 
| 14.12 (96)
| MCG
| 19,583
| 29 April 1933
|- bgcolor="#FFFFFF"
| 
| 14.15 (99)
| 
| 12.17 (89)
| Victoria Park
| 15,500
| 29 April 1933
|- bgcolor="#FFFFFF"
| 
| 12.15 (87)
| 
| 11.17 (83)
| Princes Park
| 37,000
| 29 April 1933
|- bgcolor="#FFFFFF"
| 
| 10.17 (77)
| 
| 11.13 (79)
| Junction Oval
| 14,000
| 29 April 1933
|- bgcolor="#FFFFFF"
| 
| 11.13 (79)
| 
| 11.13 (79)
| Arden Street Oval
| 12,000
| 29 April 1933
|- bgcolor="#FFFFFF"
| 
| 11.11 (77)
| 
| 10.11 (71)
| Western Oval
| 19,000
| 29 April 1933

Round 2

|- bgcolor="#CCCCFF"
| Home team
| Home team score
| Away team
| Away team score
| Venue
| Crowd
| Date
|- bgcolor="#FFFFFF"
| 
| 13.12 (90)
| 
| 11.6 (72)
| Corio Oval
| 10,000
| 6 May 1933
|- bgcolor="#FFFFFF"
| 
| 13.13 (91)
| 
| 12.6 (78)
| Windy Hill
| 17,000
| 6 May 1933
|- bgcolor="#FFFFFF"
| 
| 24.16 (160)
| 
| 9.12 (66)
| Punt Road Oval
| 19,000
| 6 May 1933
|- bgcolor="#FFFFFF"
| 
| 18.17 (125)
| 
| 14.15 (99)
| Lake Oval
| 29,000
| 6 May 1933
|- bgcolor="#FFFFFF"
| 
| 16.10 (106)
| 
| 11.15 (81)
| Brunswick Street Oval
| 22,000
| 6 May 1933
|- bgcolor="#FFFFFF"
| 
| 10.12 (72)
| 
| 11.14 (80)
| Glenferrie Oval
| 16,000
| 6 May 1933

Round 3

|- bgcolor="#CCCCFF"
| Home team
| Home team score
| Away team
| Away team score
| Venue
| Crowd
| Date
|- bgcolor="#FFFFFF"
| 
| 6.14 (50)
| 
| 4.10 (34)
| Western Oval
| 12,500
| 13 May 1933
|- bgcolor="#FFFFFF"
| 
| 10.11 (71)
| 
| 9.3 (57)
| Victoria Park
| 10,000
| 13 May 1933
|- bgcolor="#FFFFFF"
| 
| 8.9 (57)
| 
| 13.16 (94)
| Princes Park
| 14,000
| 13 May 1933
|- bgcolor="#FFFFFF"
| 
| 10.15 (75)
| 
| 10.7 (67)
| Arden Street Oval
| 5,000
| 13 May 1933
|- bgcolor="#FFFFFF"
| 
| 9.5 (59)
| 
| 21.17 (143)
| Junction Oval
| 9,000
| 13 May 1933
|- bgcolor="#FFFFFF"
| 
| 15.9 (99)
| 
| 10.10 (70)
| MCG
| 9,479
| 13 May 1933

Round 4

|- bgcolor="#CCCCFF"
| Home team
| Home team score
| Away team
| Away team score
| Venue
| Crowd
| Date
|- bgcolor="#FFFFFF"
| 
| 17.20 (122)
| 
| 11.12 (78)
| Corio Oval
| 9,000
| 20 May 1933
|- bgcolor="#FFFFFF"
| 
| 11.16 (82)
| 
| 11.13 (79)
| Brunswick Street Oval
| 22,000
| 20 May 1933
|- bgcolor="#FFFFFF"
| 
| 11.14 (80)
| 
| 10.16 (76)
| Lake Oval
| 20,000
| 20 May 1933
|- bgcolor="#FFFFFF"
| 
| 7.15 (57)
| 
| 14.10 (94)
| Glenferrie Oval
| 12,000
| 20 May 1933
|- bgcolor="#FFFFFF"
| 
| 13.15 (93)
| 
| 11.8 (74)
| Punt Road Oval
| 28,000
| 20 May 1933
|- bgcolor="#FFFFFF"
| 
| 11.10 (76)
| 
| 13.18 (96)
| Windy Hill
| 20,000
| 20 May 1933

Round 5

|- bgcolor="#CCCCFF"
| Home team
| Home team score
| Away team
| Away team score
| Venue
| Crowd
| Date
|- bgcolor="#FFFFFF"
| 
| 7.14 (56)
| 
| 9.9 (63)
| Glenferrie Oval
| 12,000
| 27 May 1933
|- bgcolor="#FFFFFF"
| 
| 12.11 (83)
| 
| 17.15 (117)
| Windy Hill
| 18,000
| 27 May 1933
|- bgcolor="#FFFFFF"
| 
| 13.19 (97)
| 
| 11.17 (83)
| Junction Oval
| 13,000
| 27 May 1933
|- bgcolor="#FFFFFF"
| 
| 10.17 (77)
| 
| 14.13 (97)
| MCG
| 22,029
| 27 May 1933
|- bgcolor="#FFFFFF"
| 
| 18.15 (123)
| 
| 2.7 (19)
| Corio Oval
| 15,000
| 27 May 1933
|- bgcolor="#FFFFFF"
| 
| 14.20 (104)
| 
| 14.16 (100)
| Victoria Park
| 25,000
| 27 May 1933

Round 6

|- bgcolor="#CCCCFF"
| Home team
| Home team score
| Away team
| Away team score
| Venue
| Crowd
| Date
|- bgcolor="#FFFFFF"
| 
| 10.13 (73)
| 
| 9.6 (60)
| Lake Oval
| 13,000
| 3 June 1933
|- bgcolor="#FFFFFF"
| 
| 13.10 (88)
| 
| 10.11 (71)
| Punt Road Oval
| 30,000
| 3 June 1933
|- bgcolor="#FFFFFF"
| 
| 19.11 (125)
| 
| 14.9 (93)
| Brunswick Street Oval
| 14,000
| 3 June 1933
|- bgcolor="#FFFFFF"
| 
| 12.11 (83)
| 
| 9.16 (70)
| Western Oval
| 20,000
| 5 June 1933
|- bgcolor="#FFFFFF"
| 
| 13.13 (91)
| 
| 12.15 (87)
| Princes Park
| 32,000
| 5 June 1933
|- bgcolor="#FFFFFF"
| 
| 17.11 (113)
| 
| 14.13 (97)
| Arden Street Oval
| 18,000
| 5 June 1933

Round 7

|- bgcolor="#CCCCFF"
| Home team
| Home team score
| Away team
| Away team score
| Venue
| Crowd
| Date
|- bgcolor="#FFFFFF"
| 
| 17.14 (116)
| 
| 13.15 (93)
| Corio Oval
| 14,000
| 10 June 1933
|- bgcolor="#FFFFFF"
| 
| 8.17 (65)
| 
| 10.13 (73)
| Brunswick Street Oval
| 29,500
| 10 June 1933
|- bgcolor="#FFFFFF"
| 
| 15.6 (96)
| 
| 16.9 (105)
| Windy Hill
| 9,000
| 10 June 1933
|- bgcolor="#FFFFFF"
| 
| 11.12 (78)
| 
| 8.14 (62)
| Arden Street Oval
| 20,000
| 10 June 1933
|- bgcolor="#FFFFFF"
| 
| 13.19 (97)
| 
| 18.18 (126)
| MCG
| 18,020
| 10 June 1933
|- bgcolor="#FFFFFF"
| 
| 10.5 (65)
| 
| 20.10 (130)
| Junction Oval
| 21,000
| 10 June 1933

Round 8

|- bgcolor="#CCCCFF"
| Home team
| Home team score
| Away team
| Away team score
| Venue
| Crowd
| Date
|- bgcolor="#FFFFFF"
| 
| 9.15 (69)
| 
| 14.9 (93)
| MCG
| 11,647
| 17 June 1933
|- bgcolor="#FFFFFF"
| 
| 8.11 (59)
| 
| 17.15 (117)
| Windy Hill
| 10,000
| 17 June 1933
|- bgcolor="#FFFFFF"
| 
| 14.23 (107)
| 
| 8.15 (63)
| Victoria Park
| 11,000
| 17 June 1933
|- bgcolor="#FFFFFF"
| 
| 21.13 (139)
| 
| 17.14 (116)
| Princes Park
| 26,000
| 17 June 1933
|- bgcolor="#FFFFFF"
| 
| 15.13 (103)
| 
| 16.12 (108)
| Lake Oval
| 30,000
| 17 June 1933
|- bgcolor="#FFFFFF"
| 
| 9.14 (68)
| 
| 11.13 (79)
| Glenferrie Oval
| 13,000
| 17 June 1933

Round 9

|- bgcolor="#CCCCFF"
| Home team
| Home team score
| Away team
| Away team score
| Venue
| Crowd
| Date
|- bgcolor="#FFFFFF"
| 
| 18.25 (133)
| 
| 3.6 (24)
| Corio Oval
| 6,000
| 24 June 1933
|- bgcolor="#FFFFFF"
| 
| 15.7 (97)
| 
| 11.12 (78)
| Brunswick Street Oval
| 20,000
| 24 June 1933
|- bgcolor="#FFFFFF"
| 
| 13.12 (90)
| 
| 3.15 (33)
| Junction Oval
| 9,000
| 24 June 1933
|- bgcolor="#FFFFFF"
| 
| 16.14 (110)
| 
| 8.11 (59)
| Punt Road Oval
| 12,000
| 24 June 1933
|- bgcolor="#FFFFFF"
| 
| 9.11 (65)
| 
| 7.18 (60)
| Western Oval
| 18,000
| 24 June 1933
|- bgcolor="#FFFFFF"
| 
| 6.17 (53)
| 
| 11.14 (80)
| Arden Street Oval
| 26,000
| 24 June 1933

Round 10

|- bgcolor="#CCCCFF"
| Home team
| Home team score
| Away team
| Away team score
| Venue
| Crowd
| Date
|- bgcolor="#FFFFFF"
| 
| 16.14 (110)
| 
| 8.8 (56)
| Punt Road Oval
| 13,000
| 1 July 1933
|- bgcolor="#FFFFFF"
| 
| 9.21 (75)
| 
| 15.18 (108)
| Windy Hill
| 11,000
| 1 July 1933
|- bgcolor="#FFFFFF"
| 
| 13.10 (88)
| 
| 12.9 (81)
| Lake Oval
| 10,000
| 1 July 1933
|- bgcolor="#FFFFFF"
| 
| 11.16 (82)
| 
| 7.15 (57)
| Corio Oval
| 15,000
| 1 July 1933
|- bgcolor="#FFFFFF"
| 
| 5.14 (44)
| 
| 15.6 (96)
| Glenferrie Oval
| 10,000
| 1 July 1933
|- bgcolor="#FFFFFF"
| 
| 5.19 (49)
| 
| 13.14 (92)
| Brunswick Street Oval
| 33,000
| 1 July 1933

Round 11

|- bgcolor="#CCCCFF"
| Home team
| Home team score
| Away team
| Away team score
| Venue
| Crowd
| Date
|- bgcolor="#FFFFFF"
| 
| 13.12 (90)
| 
| 15.13 (103)
| Arden Street Oval
| 15,000
| 8 July 1933
|- bgcolor="#FFFFFF"
| 
| 20.19 (139)
| 
| 14.14 (98)
| Victoria Park
| 8,500
| 8 July 1933
|- bgcolor="#FFFFFF"
| 
| 10.10 (70)
| 
| 9.13 (67)
| Princes Park
| 43,000
| 8 July 1933
|- bgcolor="#FFFFFF"
| 
| 21.10 (136)
| 
| 15.8 (98)
| MCG
| 6,877
| 8 July 1933
|- bgcolor="#FFFFFF"
| 
| 11.14 (80)
| 
| 7.13 (55)
| Junction Oval
| 10,000
| 8 July 1933
|- bgcolor="#FFFFFF"
| 
| 15.6 (96)
| 
| 8.14 (62)
| Western Oval
| 18,000
| 8 July 1933

Round 12

|- bgcolor="#CCCCFF"
| Home team
| Home team score
| Away team
| Away team score
| Venue
| Crowd
| Date
|- bgcolor="#FFFFFF"
| 
| 7.9 (51)
| 
| 8.15 (63)
| Glenferrie Oval
| 10,000
| 15 July 1933
|- bgcolor="#FFFFFF"
| 
| 17.16 (118)
| 
| 11.9 (75)
| Brunswick Street Oval
| 14,000
| 15 July 1933
|- bgcolor="#FFFFFF"
| 
| 14.7 (91)
| 
| 15.13 (103)
| Windy Hill
| 16,000
| 15 July 1933
|- bgcolor="#FFFFFF"
| 
| 20.15 (135)
| 
| 12.13 (85)
| Punt Road Oval
| 11,000
| 15 July 1933
|- bgcolor="#FFFFFF"
| 
| 13.18 (96)
| 
| 9.7 (61)
| Corio Oval
| 12,250
| 15 July 1933
|- bgcolor="#FFFFFF"
| 
| 15.13 (103)
| 
| 9.6 (60)
| Lake Oval
| 32,000
| 15 July 1933

Round 13

|- bgcolor="#CCCCFF"
| Home team
| Home team score
| Away team
| Away team score
| Venue
| Crowd
| Date
|- bgcolor="#FFFFFF"
| 
| 8.8 (56)
| 
| 20.11 (131)
| Arden Street Oval
| 12,000
| 22 July 1933
|- bgcolor="#FFFFFF"
| 
| 8.11 (59)
| 
| 19.15 (129)
| Western Oval
| 27,000
| 22 July 1933
|- bgcolor="#FFFFFF"
| 
| 7.21 (63)
| 
| 9.10 (64)
| Victoria Park
| 21,000
| 22 July 1933
|- bgcolor="#FFFFFF"
| 
| 13.20 (98)
| 
| 10.14 (74)
| Princes Park
| 12,000
| 22 July 1933
|- bgcolor="#FFFFFF"
| 
| 12.16 (88)
| 
| 18.15 (123)
| MCG
| 10,249
| 22 July 1933
|- bgcolor="#FFFFFF"
| 
| 12.20 (92)
| 
| 13.9 (87)
| Junction Oval
| 11,000
| 22 July 1933

Round 14

|- bgcolor="#CCCCFF"
| Home team
| Home team score
| Away team
| Away team score
| Venue
| Crowd
| Date
|- bgcolor="#FFFFFF"
| 
| 9.8 (62)
| 
| 10.14 (74)
| Glenferrie Oval
| 4,000
| 29 July 1933
|- bgcolor="#FFFFFF"
| 
| 19.10 (124)
| 
| 6.9 (45)
| Brunswick Street Oval
| 14,000
| 29 July 1933
|- bgcolor="#FFFFFF"
| 
| 14.7 (91)
| 
| 15.16 (106)
| Windy Hill
| 6,000
| 29 July 1933
|- bgcolor="#FFFFFF"
| 
| 18.16 (124)
| 
| 9.11 (65)
| Punt Road Oval
| 18,000
| 29 July 1933
|- bgcolor="#FFFFFF"
| 
| 13.11 (89)
| 
| 12.11 (83)
| Lake Oval
| 24,000
| 29 July 1933
|- bgcolor="#FFFFFF"
| 
| 17.15 (117)
| 
| 5.14 (44)
| Corio Oval
| 14,500
| 29 July 1933

Round 15

|- bgcolor="#CCCCFF"
| Home team
| Home team score
| Away team
| Away team score
| Venue
| Crowd
| Date
|- bgcolor="#FFFFFF"
| 
| 8.19 (67)
| 
| 13.15 (93)
| Junction Oval
| 20,000
| 5 August 1933
|- bgcolor="#FFFFFF"
| 
| 16.14 (110)
| 
| 9.18 (72)
| Western Oval
| 8,000
| 5 August 1933
|- bgcolor="#FFFFFF"
| 
| 15.16 (106)
| 
| 10.8 (68)
| Victoria Park
| 15,000
| 5 August 1933
|- bgcolor="#FFFFFF"
| 
| 14.22 (106)
| 
| 9.9 (63)
| Princes Park
| 15,000
| 5 August 1933
|- bgcolor="#FFFFFF"
| 
| 9.7 (61)
| 
| 15.10 (100)
| Arden Street Oval
| 8,000
| 5 August 1933
|- bgcolor="#FFFFFF"
| 
| 9.15 (69)
| 
| 13.8 (86)
| MCG
| 14,962
| 5 August 1933

Round 16

|- bgcolor="#CCCCFF"
| Home team
| Home team score
| Away team
| Away team score
| Venue
| Crowd
| Date
|- bgcolor="#FFFFFF"
| 
| 15.17 (107)
| 
| 10.12 (72)
| Arden Street Oval
| 9,000
| 19 August 1933
|- bgcolor="#FFFFFF"
| 
| 19.10 (124)
| 
| 14.10 (94)
| Western Oval
| 8,000
| 19 August 1933
|- bgcolor="#FFFFFF"
| 
| 15.8 (98)
| 
| 11.20 (86)
| Brunswick Street Oval
| 21,000
| 19 August 1933
|- bgcolor="#FFFFFF"
| 
| 14.8 (92)
| 
| 15.11 (101)
| Princes Park
| 19,000
| 19 August 1933
|- bgcolor="#FFFFFF"
| 
| 11.17 (83)
| 
| 9.6 (60)
| Punt Road Oval
| 9,000
| 19 August 1933
|- bgcolor="#FFFFFF"
| 
| 11.16 (82)
| 
| 6.4 (40)
| Lake Oval
| 13,000
| 19 August 1933

Round 17

|- bgcolor="#CCCCFF"
| Home team
| Home team score
| Away team
| Away team score
| Venue
| Crowd
| Date
|- bgcolor="#FFFFFF"
| 
| 8.12 (60)
| 
| 17.11 (113)
| Glenferrie Oval
| 12,500
| 26 August 1933
|- bgcolor="#FFFFFF"
| 
| 10.10 (70)
| 
| 14.10 (94)
| Corio Oval
| 22,250
| 26 August 1933
|- bgcolor="#FFFFFF"
| 
| 12.13 (85)
| 
| 10.17 (77)
| Windy Hill
| 13,000
| 26 August 1933
|- bgcolor="#FFFFFF"
| 
| 25.15 (165)
| 
| 17.19 (121)
| Victoria Park
| 8,000
| 26 August 1933
|- bgcolor="#FFFFFF"
| 
| 21.11 (137)
| 
| 14.21 (105)
| Junction Oval
| 9,500
| 26 August 1933
|- bgcolor="#FFFFFF"
| 
| 10.11 (71)
| 
| 19.21 (135)
| MCG
| 17,327
| 26 August 1933

Round 18

|- bgcolor="#CCCCFF"
| Home team
| Home team score
| Away team
| Away team score
| Venue
| Crowd
| Date
|- bgcolor="#FFFFFF"
| 
| 7.16 (58)
| 
| 6.17 (53)
| Western Oval
| 7,000
| 2 September 1933
|- bgcolor="#FFFFFF"
| 
| 19.13 (127)
| 
| 15.14 (104)
| Victoria Park
| 7,000
| 2 September 1933
|- bgcolor="#FFFFFF"
| 
| 20.25 (145)
| 
| 14.9 (93)
| Princes Park
| 18,000
| 2 September 1933
|- bgcolor="#FFFFFF"
| 
| 23.17 (155)
| 
| 6.10 (46)
| Lake Oval
| 30,000
| 2 September 1933
|- bgcolor="#FFFFFF"
| 
| 16.13 (109)
| 
| 9.7 (61)
| Punt Road Oval
| 21,000
| 2 September 1933
|- bgcolor="#FFFFFF"
| 
| 10.9 (69)
| 
| 8.16 (64)
| Glenferrie Oval
| 4,000
| 2 September 1933

Ladder

Finals

Semi finals

|- bgcolor="#CCCCFF"
| Home team
| Score
| Away team
| Score
| Venue
| Crowd
| Date
|- bgcolor="#FFFFFF"
| 
| 10.11 (71)
| 
| 12.12 (84)
| MCG
| 40,225
| 9 September
|- bgcolor="#FFFFFF"
| 
| 11.11 (77)
| 
| 14.11 (95)
| MCG
| 49,303
| 16 September

Preliminary Final

|- bgcolor="#CCCCFF"
| Home team
| Score
| Away team
| Score
| Venue
| Crowd
| Date
|- bgcolor="#FFFFFF"
| 
| 13.5 (83)
| 
| 10.14 (74)
| MCG
| 48,125
| 23 September

Grand final

South Melbourne defeated Richmond 9.17 (71) to 4.5 (29), in front of a crowd of 75,754 people. (For an explanation of scoring see Australian rules football).

Awards
 The 1933 VFL Premiership team was South Melbourne.
 The VFL's leading goalkicker was Gordon Coventry of Collingwood with 108 goals.
 The winner of the 1933 Brownlow Medal was Wilfred Smallhorn of Fitzroy with 18 votes.
 Essendon took the "wooden spoon" in 1933. Essendon would not "win" another wooden spoon until 2016 (eighty-three years), the second longest spoon drought in league history.
Melbourne 10.15 (75) defeated  10.14 (74) in the Grand Final, played as a stand-alone game on Thursday 28 September (Show Day holiday) at the Melbourne Cricket Ground before a crowd of 9,500.

Notable events
 "Checker" Hughes took over as coach of Melbourne. He renamed the team "The Demons" from "The Fuchsias."
 In Round 5, St Kilda defeated North Melbourne 13.19 (97) to 11.17 (83), despite having only 15 players left at the end of a brutal match, which was stopped at one stage because a wild brawl, instigated by the North Melbourne players, had erupted in the centre.
St Kilda captain Clarrie Hindson had a broken ankle, full-forward Bill Mohr had two broken ribs, forward Jack Anderson had been knocked unconscious, centreman W.C. "Billy" Roberts was felled once, recovered, and then was felled a second time, and rover Roy "Tiger" Bence was also knocked out.
The St Kilda President, Gallipoli veteran and naval war hero Commander Fred Arlington-Burke, described St Kilda's 15-man victory as the greatest moral victory in the club's history, and a "Badge of Courage" was struck by the Football Club and was awarded to each of the players that took part in the match.
The medallion is silver, coin shaped, with coin-like reeding around its outer perimeter (with no circumferential milling), with a St Kilda Football Club badge affixed to it, and the following inscription: "St KILDA DEFEATED Nth MELBOURNE WITH 15 MEN MAY 27th 1933". (Photograph of Medal at Ross, 1996, p. 140)
 In Round 8, Essendon experimented with a siren, rather than a bell at Windy Hill.
 In the dying minutes of the close – match in Round 8, umpire Jack McMurray Sr. awarded a controversial free kick against  full back Maurie Sheahan, judging that he was deliberately wasting time by setting up to kick in with a place kick after a South Melbourne behind – despite the fact that time was off until the kick-in was executed. The resulting goal narrowed South Melbourne's deficit to five points, but the siren sounded almost immediately after the next centre bounce.
 In the 1933 Interstate Carnival, held in Sydney, the Victorian team won all five of its matches.
 During the 1933 Carnival, the Australian National Football Council considered a proposal from the New South Wales Rugby Football League that the two codes merge and play a single, Australian "national" game. A trial match of this proposed universal football was conducted behind closed doors during the carnival. The ANFC subsequently rejected the proposal.
 The President of the South Melbourne Football Club, grocery magnate Archie Crofts, had brought so many interstate players to South Melbourne – with the promise of a well-paid regular job in one of the Crofts Grocery chain stores in addition to their receiving maximum playing and training fees allowable under the "Coulter Law" – that the 1933 team was christened "The Foreign Legion". Those comprising the "Foreign Legion" were Bert Beard, John Bowe, Brighton Diggins, Bill Faul, and Joe O'Meara from Western Australia, Ossie Bertram, Wilbur Harris, and Jack Wade from South Australia, and Frank Davies and Laurie Nash from Tasmania. South Melbourne played in four consecutive Grand Finals from 1933 to 1936, but won only the 1933 premiership.
North Melbourne's win over Collingwood in Round 6 was the first by one of the three 1925 entrants (Footscray, Hawthorn, North Melbourne) over the Magpies.  Prior to that, Collingwood had won the first 37 meetings against the three newest clubs.  Footscray's first win over Collingwood came in Round 9 of this year, but Hawthorn would not record its first win over Collingwood until Round 5 of the 1942 VFL season (in the 30th regular-season meeting between the two clubs).

See also
 List of VFL debuts in 1933

Footnotes

References  
 Hogan, P., The Tigers of Old, The Richmond Football Club, (Richmond), 1996. 
 Rogers, S. & Brown, A., Every Game Ever Played: VFL/AFL Results 1897–1997 (Sixth Edition), Viking Books, (Ringwood), 1998. 
 Ross, J. (ed), 100 Years of Australian Football 1897–1996: The Complete Story of the AFL, All the Big Stories, All the Great Pictures, All the Champions, Every AFL Season Reported, Viking, (Ringwood), 1996.

External links
 1933 Season – AFL Tables
 1933 – Round 5 St Kilda v North Melbourne – 15 men defeat 18 – BoylesFootballPhotos
 1933 ANFC Sydney Carnival – BoylesFootballPhotos
 Full Points Footy: 1933 Sydney Carnival

Australian Football League seasons
Vfl season